The men's discus throw event at the 1990 Commonwealth Games was held at the Mount Smart Stadium in Auckland.

Results

References

Discus
1990